James Oldknow (12 March 1873 — 10 September 1944) was an English cricketer who played first-class cricket for Derbyshire in 1901.

Oldknow was born in Denby, Derbyshire, the son of William Wheatcroft Oldknow, a coal miner, and his wife Jane.

Oldknow made his first-class debut for Derbyshire in the 1901 season in a game in May against Yorkshire, when he took 3 wickets for 123 in the first innings. He took a wicket and two catches in his next and last game against Surrey. Oldknow was a right-arm medium-pace bowler and took 4 first-class wickets at an average of 40.50 and a best performance of 3-123. He was a right-handed batsman and played 4 innings in 2 first-class matches at an average of 2.33 and a highest score of 7 not out.

Oldknow died in Belper at the age of 71.

References

1873 births
1944 deaths
English cricketers
Derbyshire cricketers
People from Denby
Cricketers from Derbyshire